Sundar Tatar is a village in Jalandhar district of Punjab State, India. The village is administrated by Sarpanch, as an elected representative of the village.

Transport 
Nurmahal railway station is the nearest train station.

References 

Villages in Jalandhar district